Girolamo Comi (1507–1581) was a 16th-century Italian Renaissance painter. 

Not much is known about Girolamo Comi's life except through his works. He primarily painted religious-themed paintings for church commissions. One work executed by Comi The Madonna with St George is part of the York Museums Trust collection.

References

1507 births
1581 deaths
16th-century Italian painters
Italian male painters
Italian Renaissance painters